Patrick Joseph Barry DD (November 15, 1868 – August 12, 1940) was an Irish-born prelate of the Roman Catholic Church. He served as bishop of the Diocese of St. Augustine in Florida from 1922 until his death in 1940.

Biography

Early life 
Patrick Barry was born on November 15, 1868, in County Clare, Ireland, one of 18 children of Michael and Catherine (née Dixon) Barry. After attending national school, he enrolled at Mungret College in Limerick, Ireland, in 1887, taking exams in the Royal University of Ireland from which he graduated. In 1890, he began his studies for the priesthood at St. Patrick's College in Carlow, Ireland. As a seminarian, he was recruited to serve the missions in Florida in the United States.

Priesthood 
Barry was ordained a priest by Bishop Michael Comerford in Ireland for the Diocese of St. Augustine on June 9, 1895. After his ordination, Barry immigrated to Florida, where he was appointed as a curate at Immaculate Conception Parish in Jacksonville. He later worked as a chaplain for the US Armed Forces during the Spanish–American War. After the war, Barry served as pastor of St. Monica's Parish in Palatka, Florida (1903–1913), and then as rector of St. Augustine's Cathedral and as vicar general of the diocese (1917–1921).

Bishop of St. Augustine 
On February 22, 1922, Barry was appointed the fifth bishop of the Diocese of St. Augustine by Pope Pius XI. He received his episcopal consecration on May 3, 1922, from Archbishop Michael Curley, with Bishops John J. Monaghan and William Turner serving as co-consecrators. 

In 1931, Barry instituted an annual pilgrimage to the shrine of Nuestra Señora de la Leche at the Mission Nombre de Dios in St. Augustine in order to draw attention to the heritage of the Catholic Church in St. Augustine. In June 1932, Barry went with Cardinal Patrick Hayes to attend the World Eucharistic Congress in Dublin, Ireland. In 1940, Barry founded Barry University in Miami Shores along with his sister, Mother M. Gerald Barry, and his brother, Father William Barry.

Patrick Barry died from heart disease at St. Vincent's Hospital in Jacksonville, on August 12, 1940, at age 71.

References

1868 births
1940 deaths
People from County Clare
19th-century Irish people
Alumni of Carlow College
Roman Catholic bishops of Saint Augustine
Irish emigrants to the United States (before 1923)
American military chaplains
Spanish–American War chaplains
19th-century American clergy